Overture Films was an American film production and distribution company and a subsidiary of Starz (then subsidiary of Liberty Media). It was founded in November 2006 by Chris McGurk and Danny Rosett. Through its affiliated companies Anchor Bay Entertainment, Starz Entertainment Pay Channels, Starz Media, and Starz Play, Overture Films made its films available worldwide to viewers across multiple platforms via their home video, premium television, and Internet distribution channels.

Although the studio had some minor critical successes with films like Capitalism: A Love Story and Sunshine Cleaning, the company suffered poor box office returns, and Starz closed the company in 2010, although rumors circulated early that year that it would be sold off. Its marketing and distribution assets are now handled by Relativity Media.

Released movies

Notes and references

2006 establishments in California
2010 disestablishments in California
American companies established in 2006
American companies disestablished in 2010
Companies based in Beverly Hills, California
Defunct American film studios
Entertainment companies based in California
Film distributors of the United States
Film production companies of the United States
Former Lionsgate subsidiaries
Mass media companies established in 2006
Mass media companies disestablished in 2010